Alexander Nikolayevich Lebedev (1869–1937) was a biochemist in the Russian Empire and the Soviet Union. He is known for his early experiments on the biochemical basis of behavior. Lebedev apprenticed as a student with physiologist and psychologist Ivan Pavlov, becoming familiar with various techniques involved used in behavioral psychology. Lebedev developed a theory that behavior in general, and specifically conditioned behavior, had a biochemical rather than psychological basis. He began his studies in biochemistry in Moscow State University, obtaining a doctorate in 1898.  He then proceeded to publish widely on the topic of "biochemistry of the mind" and is considered by some to have pioneered the field of neuropharmacology.

Sources

Cooper, D. M. Russian Science Reader, Oxford, Pergamon Press; NY, Macmillan (1964).

Biochemists from the Russian Empire
Soviet scientists
Moscow State University alumni
1869 births
1937 deaths